Elizabeth R. Varon (born December 16, 1963) is an American historian, and Langbourne M. Williams Professor of American History at the University of Virginia.

Life
Varon graduated from Swarthmore College (B.A.,1985), and from Yale University, (Ph.D., 1993).
She was professor of history at Wellesley College, and Temple University.

She is an Organization of American Historians lecturer.
She was co-director of the Society for Historians of the Early American Republic.

She and her husband, William I. Hitchcock, reside in Charlottesville, Virginia. They have two children.

Works

Southern Lady, Yankee Spy: The True Story of Elizabeth Van Lew, a Union Agent in the Heart of the Confederacy, Oxford University Press, USA, 2003,

References

External links

21st-century American historians
University of Virginia faculty
Swarthmore College alumni
Wellesley College faculty
Temple University faculty
Yale University alumni
Living people
American women historians
1963 births
21st-century American women writers